The position of Chief Rabbi of Jerusalem was instituted centuries ago and was originally held by  a member of the Sephardic community. Moses Galante served as Rishon LeZion, the title used from beginning of the 17th century to refer to the chief rabbi of Jerusalem. In 1878, the Ashkenazi community appointed their own representative. Since then, Jerusalem has had two chief rabbis, each representing their respective communities.

Since the establishment of the State of Israel, the function of chief rabbi includes representing the city in high level diplomatic meetings and important ceremonies. The position can be held until the age of 75 but can be extended till the age of 80.

Official Ashkenazic representation

Although an informal Ashkenazi rabbinical court existed in Jerusalem from 1837 with Zundel Salant at its helm, it was not until 1841 that his son-in-law, Shmuel Salant, opened a proper Beis Din in a room at the Hurva complex. In 1860, Salant appointed Meir Aurbach to replace him as chief rabbi. Upon his death in 1878, the post returned to Salant who held it until his death in 1909. Through his efforts after he retook office in 1878, Salant was able to procure the dignities previously granted by the Ottoman government only to the Sephardim, for the Ashkenazim as well. He became the first official Ashkenazic Chief Rabbi of Jerusalem.

At the turn of the 20th century, an aging Salant approached Yosef Chaim Zonnenfeld to assist him, but he refused the offer. In 1898 a letter was sent to Chaim Ozer Grodzinski of Vilna requesting his advice in the matter. This resulted in Eliyahu David Rabinowitz-Teomim being appointed in 1901 as chief rabbi. However, Rabinowitz-Teomim predeceased him in 1905 aged 62. Four years later Salant died aged 93, and Chaim Berlin of Moscow, son of the Netziv, took the position. Berlin died 3 years later in 1912. With Zonnenfeld still refusing to take up the offer and another candidate, Yitzchak Yerucham Diskin coosing to remain director of the Diskin Orphanage, the position was unfilled.

Abraham Isaac Kook, rabbi of Jaffa until 1914, became Chief Rabbi of Jerusalem in 1919. In 1921 he established the Chief Rabbinate for the Jewish community in Palestine. He remained chief rabbi until his death in 1935. In 1936 Tzvi Pesach Frank was elected Ashkenazi chief rabbi of Jerusalem, and held the position until his death in 1960. Yitzchak Kolitz was appointed the city's Ashkenazi chief rabbi in 1983. Aryeh Stern replaced him on October 22, 2014 after the position had been vacant for eleven years following the passing of Kolitz in 2003. Shlomo Amar was simultaneously elected the Sephardi chief rabbi.

Current election process

In 2003–2014 there was no Chief Rabbi of Jerusalem  and the election process is proving controversial. In dispute is the process that brought about the creation of a 24-man body that represents Jerusalem's synagogues. This is half of the 48-person electoral body responsible for choosing the two rabbis. Presently, the 24-man body is made up of 19 haredi representatives and five religious Zionists.

The vote resulted with the election of Rabbi Aryeh Stern with a majority of 27 of the 48 representatives from the city's synagogues, city councils, and voters appointed by Naftali Bennett. He had been elected the candidate of the Religious Zionism sector in 2009. Jerusalem mayor Nir Barkat was against the appointment of two Haredi chief rabbis and wanted one of the elected rabbis to belong to the religious Zionist stream of Judaism. He stated that "the chief rabbi has an important role as representative of the city and its citizens. He must be a figure engaged in issues connected to all segments of the city's population and understand the needs of the entire population that receives religious services." "It is only proper that the chief rabbis of the capital be chosen in a democratic way that reflects the population. Therefore, I am pushing for the creation of an electoral body... that represents the true makeup of the city: 70% general population, 30% haredi." Others had suggested that the citizens of Jerusalem elect the rabbis themselves. Upon his election, Rabbi Stern said, "It is in my intention to serve as the rabbi of all Jerusalemites: secular, modern-orthodox and charedi alike. The Jerusalem rabbinate is a great merit, but it also comprises a hefty responsibility. I will make sure that the religious services will become accessible and friendly and will serve as an outstanding model for all of the other rabbinates in Israel".

List

Sephardi

16th century
Levi Ibn Habib 
David ben Solomon ibn Abi Zimra
Moshe ben Mordechai Galante
Haim Vital
Bezalel Ashkenazi
Gedaliah Cordovero
Yitzhak Gaon (?)
Israel Benjamin
Yaacov Tzemah
Shemuel Garmison

17th century
Moshe Ibn Habib (1689–1696)
Moshe Hayun

18th century
Abraham ben David Yitzchaki (1715–1722)
Binyamin Maali
Elazar ben Yaacob Nahum (1730–1748)
Nissim Mizrahi (1748–1754)
Israel Yaacob Algazy (1754–1756)
Haim Raphael Abraham ben Asher (1771–1772)
Yom Tov Algazi (1772–1802)

19th century
Moshe Yosef Mordechai Meyuchas (1802–1805)
Yaacob Moshe Ayash al-Maghrebi (1806–1817)
Jacob Coral (1817–1819)
Raphael Yosef Hazzan (1819–1822)
Yom Tov Danon (1822–1824)
Salomon Moshe Suzin (1824–1836)
Yonah Moshe Navon (1836–1841)
Yehudah Raphael Navon (1841–1842)
Haim Nissim Abulafia (1854–1861)
Haim David Hazan (1861–1869)
Avraham Ashkenazi (1869–1880)
Raphael Meir Panigel (1880–1892)
Yaacob Shaul Elyashar (1893–1906)

20th century to present
Eliyah Moshe Panigel (1907–1909)
Nahman Batito (1909–1911)
Moshe Franco (1911–1915)
Haim Moshe Elyashar (1914–1915)
Nissim Yehudah Danon (1915–1921)
Chalom Messas (1978–2003)
Shlomo Amar (2014–)

Ashkenazi

19th century
Meir Auerbach (1860–1871/8)
Shmuel Salant (1871/8–1909)

20th century to present
Chaim Berlin (1909–1912?)

Abraham Isaac Kook (1919–1935)
Tzvi Pesach Frank (1936–?)

Betzalel Zolty (1977–?)
Yitzhak Kolitz (1983–2002)
Aryeh Stern (2014–)

See also
Grand Mufti of Jerusalem
Patriarch of Jerusalem (disambiguation)

References